Nymphulosis is a genus of moths of the family Crambidae. It contains only one species, Nymphulosis arcanella, is found in Iraq.

References

Natural History Museum Lepidoptera genus database

Pyraustinae
Taxa named by Hans Georg Amsel
Monotypic moth genera
Crambidae genera